The 1961 Bristol South East by-election was a by-election held on 4 May 1961 for the British House of Commons constituency of Bristol South East in the city of Bristol.

The seat had become vacant when the constituency's Labour Member of Parliament (MP), Tony Benn, had inherited a hereditary peerage from his father and became Viscount Stansgate, thus making him automatically ineligible to serve in the House of Commons. He had been elected at a by-election in 1950.

Benn stood in the by-election anyway—claiming that he had not asked for and would not ask for a writ of summons to the House of Lords—and won the majority of votes, but he was forbidden by Parliamentary authorities to physically return to the Commons due to his ineligibility. The Conservative Party candidate Malcolm St Clair—who was himself the heir to a peerage—filed a petition against the result, and was declared the winner after a court challenge.

When the law was later changed by the Peerage Act 1963 to allow Benn to renounce his peerage, Benn immediately did so and, fulfilling a promise to the electors of Bristol South East, St Clair resigned his seat. Benn was returned to the House of Commons at the 1963 Bristol South East by-election, which was not contested by the Conservatives.

Votes

See also
 Tony Benn
 Bristol South East constituency
 1950 Bristol South East by-election
 1963 Bristol South East by-election
 List of United Kingdom by-elections
 Re Bristol South-East Parliamentary Election

References 

British Parliamentary by-elections, 1961: Bristol South East

1961 in England
Tony Benn
1961 elections in the United Kingdom
South East
1960s in Bristol
May 1961 events in the United Kingdom